is a train station in Jōyō, Kyoto Prefecture, Japan, operated by West Japan Railway Company (JR West). It has the station number "JR-D13".

Lines
Nagaike Station is served by the Nara Line.

Layout
The station consists of two side platforms serving one track each. The station building is located above the tracks. The concourse serves as a free passage connecting the north and south of the station since 27 May 2012, together with the building and spaces used by local residents. The IC card ticket "ICOCA" can be used at this station.

Platforms

History
Station numbering was introduced in March 2018 with Nagaike being assigned station number JR-D13.

Passenger statistics
According to the Kyoto Prefecture statistical report, the average number of passengers per day is as follows.

Adjacent stations

References

External links

  

Railway stations in Kyoto Prefecture